The Belgian National Time Trial Championships are held annually as part of the Belgian National Cycling Championships, deciding the national champion in this discipline for the year to come. The national time trial championship in Belgium is a relatively new competition, especially when compared to the Belgium National Road Race Championship, which was first held in 1894.

The first winner of the men's elite time trial championships was Marc Streel in 1997. The race was not held the following year, and Marc Streel retained his title in 1999. In 2000 the Rik Verbrugghe was crowned champion, who holds the record for the fastest average speed in a time trial race in a Grand Tour, which he achieved by winning the 2001 Giro d'Italia prologue. Marc Wauters, Leif Hoste and Kristof Vandewalle hold the record for most wins in the championships, with three wins apiece.

The winners of each event are awarded with a symbolic cycling jersey which is black yellow and red, like the national flag. These colours can be worn by the rider at other time trialling events to show their status as national champion. The champion's stripes can be combined into a sponsored rider's team kit design for this purpose.

Men

Elite

Under 23

Junior

Women

Elite

Junior

See also
Belgian National Road Race Championships
National Road Cycling Championships

References

External links
Past winners (men) on the Cycling WebSite
2007 Results on cyclingnews.com
2005 Results on cyclingnews.com
2001 Results on cyclingnews.com

National road cycling championships
Cycle races in Belgium
National championships in Belgium
1984 establishments in Belgium
Recurring sporting events established in 1984